Helmut Schoeck (Graz, 3 July 1922 – 2 February 1993) was an Austrian-German sociologist and writer best known for his work Envy: A Theory of Social Behavior (Der Neid: Eine Theorie der Gesellschaft).

Life
Schoeck, born in Graz, spent his early years in Baden-Württemberg, finishing high school in Ludwigsburg. He then studied medicine, philosophy and psychology at the universities of Munich and Tübingen. With a dissertation on Karl Mannheim, Schoeck would obtain his doctorate under Eduard Spranger.

For fifteen years, starting in 1950, Schoeck would work as a professor at various U.S. universities. In 1953, he taught philosophy at Fairmont State College, followed by a two-year stint at Yale. At Emory University he was awarded a full professorship in sociology. During the 1950s, Schoeck published some works in German, and translated Joachim Wach's Sociology of Religion into German.

In 1965, Schoeck returned to Germany, where he obtained a chair in sociology at the Johannes Gutenberg University in Mainz, which he would occupy until his retirement in 1990.

Schoeck, who was also a columnist of the Welt am Sonntag for twenty years, died of cancer in 1993.

Envy: A Theory of Social Behavior

Schoeck gained international fame with his book Der Neid: Eine Theorie der Gesellschaft (Envy: A Theory of Social Behavior), published in 1966, with the first English translation appearing in 1969. Written without much technical jargon, the book would receive widespread appreciation, even outside the academic community. The book became somewhat of a bestseller, and was translated into more than ten languages.

Paul Dumouchel said in the book Schoeck speaks about "the origin of envy,...its cause and function within society" and also "documents the importance of envy in literature, philosophy, and in many social sciences". He went on to say that Schoeck puts forward two propositions - first, that envy has played a large part in forming human society, and that, secondly, the role of envy often remains hidden.

Schoeck also argued that as envy was a natural part of human evolution and could not be suppressed, it was important to channel the emotion. He also suggested that socialism and democracy were put forward as ideas by members of society who were not able "to deal with their own envy", and Karl Marx's idea of primitive communism was "entirely mistaken".

A polemicist against the New Left movements of the 1960s, Schoeck criticized their ideas from a conservative-liberal viewpoint. The egalitarian and anticapitalist mentality of the leftish generation was the particular target of Schoeck's ire.

Works (selected) 
 Karl Mannheim als Wissenssoziologe, Dissertation, 1948
 Nietzsches Philosophie des „Menschlich-Allzumenschlichen“. Kritische Darstellung der Aphorismen-Welt der mittleren Schaffenszeit als Versuch einer Neuorientierung des Gesamtbildes, 1948
 Soziologie. Geschichte ihrer Probleme. 1952. 2., wesentlich überarbeitete und erweiterte Auflage unter dem Titel Die Soziologie und die Gesellschaften. Problemsicht und Problemlösung von Beginn bis zur Gegenwart. 1964. Orbis academicus Band I/3. Verlag Karl Alber, Freiburg / München
 USA. Motive und Strukturen, 1958
 Was heißt politisch unmöglich?, 1959
 Scientism and Values, 1960
 Relativism and the Study of Man, 1961
 Financing Medical Care, 1962
 Psychiatry and Responsibility, 1962
 Der Neid. Eine Theorie der Gesellschaft. Verlag Karl Alber, Freiburg/München 1966, 2. Auflage 1968 (späterer Titel: Der Neid und die Gesellschaft)
 Kleines soziologisches Wörterbuch, 1969 (ab 1971: Soziologisches Wörterbuch)
 Ist Leistung unanständig?, 1971 (mehrmals erweitert)
 Vorsicht Schreibtischtäter. Politik und Presse in der Bundesrepublik, 1972
 Entwicklungshilfe. Politische Humanität, 1972
 Die Lust am schlechten Gewissen, 1973
 Das Geschäft mit dem Pessimismus, 1975
 Schülermanipulation, 1976
 Das Recht auf Ungleichheit, 1979
 Der Arzt zwischen Politik und Patient, 1983
 Die zwölf Irrtümer unseres Jahrhunderts, 1985
 Kinderverstörung. Die mißbrauchte Kindheit - Umschulung auf eine andere Republik, 1989

References

1922 births
1993 deaths
Austrian male writers
Austrian sociologists

German sociologists
German male writers
German expatriates in the United States
Yale University staff
Emory University faculty
Member of the Mont Pelerin Society